Lorenzo Vintter (11 October 1842 – 5 July 1915) was an Argentine military officer, who participated in the War of the Triple Alliance and the  Conquest of the Desert. He was governor of the Patagonia and Río Negro. He also served as governor of Formosa between 1901 and 1904.

References

1842 births
1915 deaths
Argentine people of German descent
Río de la Plata
Argentine generals

Governors of Formosa Province